The 2016–17 VfL Wolfsburg season was the 72nd season in the club's football history.

Background
VfL Wolfsburg finished the 2015–16 Bundesliga season in 8th place, thus ensuring a place in the 2016–17 Bundesliga.

Players

Squad

Transfers

In

Out

Friendly matches

Competitions

Overview

Bundesliga

League table

Results summary

Results by round

Matches

Relegation play-offs

DFB-Pokal

Statistics

Appearances and goals

|-
! colspan=14 style=background:#dcdcdc; text-align:center| Goalkeepers

|-
! colspan=14 style=background:#dcdcdc; text-align:center| Defenders

|-
! colspan=14 style=background:#dcdcdc; text-align:center| Midfielders

|-
! colspan=14 style=background:#dcdcdc; text-align:center| Forwards

|-
! colspan=14 style=background:#dcdcdc; text-align:center| Players transferred out during the season

Goalscorers

Last updated: 29 May 2017

Clean sheets

Last updated: 29 May 2017

Disciplinary record

Last updated: 29 May 2017

References

VfL Wolfsburg seasons
Wolfsburg